Kerstin Stolfig (born 5 December 1960 in East Berlin) is a German former pair skater who represented East Germany. She and her skating partner, Veit Kempe, placed sixth at the 1976 Winter Olympics and became two-time East German national silver medalists.

After retiring from competition, Stolfig married bobsledder and fellow Olympian Hans-Jürgen Gerhardt.

Results

Pairs with Kempe

Ladies' singles

External links
Sports-Reference.com

1960 births
German female pair skaters
Figure skaters at the 1976 Winter Olympics
Olympic figure skaters of East Germany
Living people